The Tithe Act 1536 (28 Hen 8 c 11) was an Act of the Parliament of England.

This Act was modified by the First Fruits and Measure 1926 and excluded by sections 68(4) and 70 of, and paragraph 3(1) of Schedule 7 to, the Pastoral Measure 1968.

Sections 1 to 3, in so far as they applied to archdeaconries and benefices, were repealed by section 47(4) of, and Schedule 8 to, the Endowments and Glebe Measure 1976.

Sections 5 and 6 were repealed by section 1 of, and the Schedule to, the Statute Law Revision Act 1863.

Section 8 was repealed by section 47(4) of, and Schedule 8 to, the Endowments and Glebe Measure 1976.

The entire Act was repealed by Statute Law (Repeals) Measure 2018

See also
Tithe Act

References
Halsbury's Statutes,

External links
The Tithe Act 1536, as amended, from The National Archives.

Acts of the Parliament of England (1485–1603)
1536 in law
1536 in England
Tithes